Scorpio's Dance is the third album by the rock band Shocking Blue. It was released in 1970 on Pink Elephant Records. The album was released under the title Sally Was a Good Old Girl in Japan.

This album continues the band's exploration into country music and Americana with tracks like "Alaska Country" and "Sally Was a Good Old Girl". It still stays true to its rock roots as well. Despite continuing their growth as a band, the album did not fare so well in America.

Since the album's reissue in 1990 it featured the singles "Send Me a Postcard", "Mighty Joe" and "Hello Darkness", the latter with b-side, as bonus tracks both on CD and LP.

Track listing

Personnel
Shocking Blue
 Mariska Veres - vocals
 Robbie van Leeuwen - guitar, sitar, backing vocals
 Cor van der Beek - drums
 Klaasje van der Wal - bass guitar

Charts

References

1970 albums
Shocking Blue albums